J. Peter Kincaid (born 1942) is a scientist and educator who is the founding director of the Modeling and Simulation Ph.D. program at the University of Central Florida. Trained as a human factors psychologist at the Ohio State University, Kincaid has split his career between higher education and working as a scientist for the U.S. military. He developed the Flesch-Kincaid Readability Test for the U.S. Navy.

Education
He received degrees in psychology and human factors.
Oberlin College (BA 1964)
Ohio State University (PhD 1971)

References 

American educators
1942 births
Living people
American scientists